Monts is a commune in the Indre-et-Loire department in central France.

It was here at the Château de Candé on 3 June 1937 that The Duke of Windsor, formerly King Edward VIII, married the twice-divorced Wallis Warfield Simpson for whom he had abdicated the throne of Britain and the Empire.

They have an association football team playing in the Promotion d'Honneur de Centre, the eighth division of the French football league system. They are called AS Monts. They were founded in 1924 and play at the Stade des Griffonnes. Their kit is blue.

Population

See also
Communes of the Indre-et-Loire department

References

Communes of Indre-et-Loire